John Thomas Scharf (May 1, 1843 – February 28, 1898) was an American historian, author, journalist, antiquarian, politician, lawyer and Confederate States of America soldier and sailor. He is best known for his published historical works. Modern historians and researchers cite his comprehensive histories as primary source materials.

Scharf used a formulaic and detailed approach to preparing his historical works. He contacted everyone who could provide information about his subject and used detail questionnaires to capture responses to his inquiries. The J. Thomas Scharf Collection, 1730s–1892, held by the Maryland Historical Society, shows off his massive collection of original source materials.

Scharf was one of the first American historians to consistently use newspapers as a primary source. Rather than trying to analyze the source material, he often quoted at length from newspapers, magazines, pamphlets, and state and city documents. His books are written in the flowery style of his day, and several of his works, although long, are still considered among the best primary sources available. When writing about the American Civil War, the central event of his generation, he could not remain objective, and clearly articulated his strong pro-South perspective and prejudice about the war he fought. Still, his History of the Confederate States Navy remains a particularly valuable contribution to the literature of the American Civil War.

At the outbreak of the war, Scharf enlisted with the 1st Maryland Artillery. He fought in the Confederate States Army and Navy. Returning from the war, Scharf helped reorganize the Maryland state militia. He practiced law and took positions as a city editor for the Baltimore Evening News and managing editor for the Baltimore Sunday Telegram. He accumulated a mass of papers on the city of Baltimore and from these he published his first major work, The Chronicles of Baltimore.

In 1878, Scharf, a Democrat from Baltimore City-District 2, was elected and served one term in the Maryland General Assembly, House of Delegates. He served as Commissioner of the Land Office of Maryland from 1884 until 1892 and was an active member of the Maryland Historical Society. In the year before he died he was dismissed from his position as "Special Chinese Inspector" for the Southern District of New York, a post charged with enforcing the Chinese Exclusion Act of 1882 and the Geary Act of 1892.

Works

References

Further reading
 References used by – 
 Richard J. Cox, A Century of Frustration: The Movement for a State Archives in Maryland, 1811–1935, Maryland Historical Magazine, 78 (Summer 1983): 106–117.
 Francis B. Culver, The War Romance of John Thomas Scharf, Maryland Historical Magazine, 21 (September 1926): 295–302.
 Edward G. Howard, Introduction to History of Baltimore City and County, by J. Thomas Scharf (Baltimore: Regional Publishing, 1971).
 Morris L. Radoff, An Elusive Manuscript—The Proceedings of the Maryland Convention of 1774, American Archivist, 30 (January 1967): 59–65.
 Radoff, Foreword to The History of Maryland, by J. Thomas Scharf (Hatboro, Pa.: Tradition Press, 1967).
 Frank F. White, Jr., ed., Correspondence of Jefferson Davis and J. Thomas Scharf, Journal of Mississippi History, 10 (April 1948): 118–131.
 Tom Kelley, The personal memoirs of Jonathan Thomas Scharf of the First Maryland Artillery, Baltimore: Butternut and Blue, (1992). . .
 
 Maryland Historical Society, Proceedings of the Maryland historical society, in connection with the celebration of the one hundred and fiftieth anniversary of the settlement of Baltimore, Baltimore:J. Murphy & Co, (1880). .
 Catalogue of aportion of the library of J. Thomas Scharf, Boston, Mass: C.F. Libbie & Co, (1883). .

External links

 
 J. Thomas Scharf Collection, 1730s–1892, preserved by the Maryland Historical Society, H. Furlong Baldwin Library
Maryland State Archives, a Maryland historical agency and central depository for government records of permanent value.
History of 1st Maryland Artillery, CSA, available through Maryland Units in the Civil War, a website devoted to said topic.

Writers from Baltimore
People of Maryland in the American Civil War
1843 births
1898 deaths
American sailors
19th-century American historians
Confederate States Army soldiers
Deaths from pneumonia in New York City
History of Baltimore
Democratic Party members of the Maryland House of Delegates
American naval historians
19th-century American journalists
American male journalists
19th-century American politicians
19th-century American male writers
Historians from Maryland